Aivo is an Estonian masculine given name.

People named Aivo include:
Aivo Udras (born 1970), biathlete
Aivo Orav (born 1965), diplomat
Aivo Välja (born 1968), dirigent

Estonian masculine given names